Cosmosoma pheres is a moth of the subfamily Arctiinae. It was described by Caspar Stoll in 1782. It is found in Rio de Janeiro, Brazil.

References

pheres
Moths described in 1782